Tennis was contested at the 1966 Asian Games in Bangkok, Thailand from December 10 to December 20, 1966. Tennis had doubles and singles events for men and women, as well as a mixed doubles competition.

Japan and Indonesia dominated the events winning all seven gold medals.

Medalists

Medal table

See also
 Tennis at the Asian Games

References

 Asian Games Roll of Honour (1962-2006)

External links
 OCA website

 
1966 Asian Games events
1966
Asian Games
1966 Asian Games